Nils Frykdahl is an American musician, most known for his work with the bands Sleepytime Gorilla Museum and Idiot Flesh. He is also a member of the bands Free Salamander Exhibit, Faun Fables, and Darling Freakhead, and used to be a member of Charming Hostess. Along with bandmates Carla Kihlstedt and Dan Rathbun, Frykdahl is active with the performance company Ink Boat.

He is also the voice of Tigtone in the 2014 animated short, The Begun of Tigtone. He also reprises his role as the titular character in a 2019 Adult Swim animated television series, Tigtone.

He holds a bachelor's degree in music from UC Berkeley, which he received in 1989.

Discography

With Idiot Flesh 
Drip Demo (demo, 1986) (as Acid Rain)
We Were All Very Worried (demo, 1987) (as Acid Rain)
Rite of Spring (Demo 1988) (As Acid Rain)
Tales of Instant Knowledge and Sure Death (full-length, 1990)
The Nothing Show (full-length, 1994)
Teen Devil/Twitch (7-inch single, 1995)
Fancy (full-length, 1997)

With Faun Fables
Early Song (full-length, 1999)
Mother Twilight (full-length, 2001)
Family Album (full-length, 2004)
The Transit Rider (full-length, 2006)
A Table Forgotten (EP, 2008)
Light of a Vaster Dark (full-length, 2010)
Born of the Sun (full-length, 2016)
Live in Norway (full-length, 2022)

With Sleepytime Gorilla Museum 
Grand Opening and Closing (full-length, 2001)
Live (full-length, 2003)
Of Natural History (full-length, 2004)
The Face (DVD, 2005)
In Glorious Times (full-length, 2007)

With Free Salamander Exhibit 
Undestroyed (full-length, 2016)

As a guest musician 
 Barbez - Barbez (2004)
Charming Hostess - Sarajevo Blues (2004)
Charming Hostess - The Bowls Project CD (2010)
 Moe! Staiano's Moe!kestra! - An Inescapable Siren Therein And Other Whereabouts (2006) (plays flute on Piece No.5)
Už Jsme Doma - Rybí tuk (Cod Liver Oil) (2007)
Indukti - IDMEN (2009)
Stolen Babies - "Stolen Babies"  (2020)

Filmography

Film

References

External links
 

Year of birth missing (living people)
Living people
American multi-instrumentalists
American male singers
American rock singers
Drag City (record label) artists
Guitarists from California
Musicians from Oakland, California
American male guitarists